Gastric arteries may refer to:

 Left gastric artery
 Left gastro-omental artery
 Right gastric artery
 Right gastro-omental artery
 Short gastric arteries